The 1928 United States elections was held on November 6. In the last election before the start of the Great Depression, the Republican Party retained control of the presidency and bolstered their majority in both chambers of Congress.

Republican former Secretary of Commerce Herbert Hoover defeated Democratic nominee New York Governor Al Smith. Hoover won a landslide victory, taking several Southern states and winning almost every state outside the South. Democrats suffered from voter prejudice against Roman Catholics like Smith. As incumbent President Calvin Coolidge declined to seek re-election, Hoover won the Republican nomination on the first ballot. Like Hoover, Smith also won his party's nomination on the first ballot.

The Republicans gained thirty-two seats in the House of Representatives, furthering a majority over the Democrats. The Republicans also increased a majority in the Senate, gaining eight seats.

See also
1928 United States presidential election
1928 United States House of Representatives elections
1928 United States Senate elections
1928 United States gubernatorial elections

References

 
1928